Intradermal injection, often abbreviated ID, is a shallow or superficial injection of a substance into the dermis, which is located between the epidermis and the hypodermis. For certain substances, administration via an ID route can result in a faster systemic uptake compared with subcutaneous injections, leading to a stronger immune response to vaccinations, immunology and novel cancer treatments, and faster drug uptake. Additionally, since administration is closer to the surface of the skin, the body's reaction to substances is more easily visible. However, due to complexity of the procedure compared to subcutaneous injection and intramuscular injection, administration via ID is relatively rare, and is only used for tuberculosis and allergy tests, Monkeypox vaccination, and certain therapies.

Injection sites
Common injection sites include the inner surface of the forearm and the upper back, under the shoulder blade.

Equipment
Equipment include syringes calibrated in tenths and hundredths of a milliliter. The dosage given is usually less than 0.5 mL, less than given subcutaneously or intramuscularly. A  and 26 or 27 gauge thick needle is used.

Mantoux procedure

The traditional procedure of ID injection known as the Mantoux procedure (as used in the Mantoux test) involves injecting at angle of administration of 5 to 15 degrees angle, almost against the skin.

Intradermic needles
Traditionally hypodermic needles are used for intradermal injections, instead of intradermic needles. Various microneedle technology researchers worldwide develop new devices and therapies to overcome typical usability issues associated with the traditional Mantoux procedure. Most intradermic needles require a change in injection technique or instruction to use, for example a perpendicular intradermal injection.

Immune reaction tests sometimes use a set of non-hollow needles for scarification, shallowly abrading the skin. The inoculation is limited to the dermis.

See also 
 Subcutaneous injection
 Intramuscular injection
 Intravenous injection

References 

Medical procedures
Injection (medicine)